David Orr (born 1974) is an American journalist, attorney, and poet who is noted for his reviews and essays on poetry.

Orr grew up in Columbia, South Carolina. He earned a bachelor's degree in English literature from Princeton University in 1996, and subsequently a J.D. degree from Yale Law School. While still a law student, Orr published a review in Poetry Magazine. While practicing law, Orr has written reviews and essays for Poetry Magazine, The New York Times, and other periodicals. Orr was awarded the 2004 Nona Balakian Citation for Excellence in Reviewing of the National Book Critics Circle. In 2005 he became a columnist for the New York Times Sunday Review of Books, where his On Poetry column appears occasionally. He was the Hodder Fellow at Princeton University in 2006-2007.

Several of Orr's poems have been published in Poetry Magazine. In 2011 he published Beautiful & Pointless: A Guide to Modern Poetry, of which Craig Morgan Teicher has written, "David Orr, the New York Times Book Review'''s poetry columnist as well as a poet, is a guide after my own heart as he seeks not just to initiate the uninitiated in his new book, Beautiful & Pointless, but also to hold a mirror up to the poetry world itself."

Further reading
 Recommended as exemplary by Edward Champion.
 This article was a response to Dana Goodyear's article in The New Yorker about Ruth Lilly's $200 million bequest to the Poetry Foundation. The bequest, the Poetry Foundation's response to it, and the articles by Goodyear and Orr have been controversial.
 Example of Orr's occasional column, On Poetry, from The New York Times Sunday Book Review.
 Television program featuring Sam Tanenhaus (editor of the New York Times Book Review'') as guest host, Alice Quinn (editor of Elizabeth Bishop's unpublished poetry), and Orr in a discussion of Bishop's poetry and life.

References

External links
 Author website.

Princeton University alumni
Living people
1974 births
Yale Law School alumni
American male poets
American male journalists
21st-century American poets
21st-century American male writers